The 2011–12 James Madison Dukes men's basketball team represented James Madison University during the 2011–12 NCAA Division I men's basketball season. The Dukes, led by fourth year head coach Matt Brady, played their home games at the James Madison University Convocation Center as members of the Colonial Athletic Association. The Dukes completed the regular season 12–19, 5–13 in CAA play to finish tied for eighth place. As the eighth seed in the CAA tournament, the Dukes were defeated by UNC Wilmington 70–59 in the first round to end their season.

Schedule

|-
!colspan=9 style=|Exhibition

|-
!colspan=9 style=|Regular Season

|-
!colspan=9 style=| CAA tournament
|-

Source:

References

James Madison Dukes men's basketball seasons
James Madison
James Madison Dukes men's basketball team
James Madison Dukes men's basketball team